Maria Koppenhöfer (11 December 1901 – 29 November 1948) was a German film actress.

Selected filmography
 The Opera Ball (1931)
 24 Hours in the Life of a Woman (1931)
 Unheimliche Geschichten (1932)
 The First Right of the Child (1932)
 A Song for You (1933)
 So Ended a Great Love (1934)
 Frisians in Peril (1935)
 Joan of Arc (1935)
 The Abduction of the Sabine Women (1936)
 The Ruler (1937)
 The Mountain Calls (1938)
 Shadows Over St. Pauli (1938)
 Anna Favetti (1938)
 The Great and the Little Love (1938)
 Midsummer Night's Fire (1939)
 Kora Terry (1940)
 Bismarck (1940)
 The Heart of a Queen (1940)
 The Rainer Case (1942)
 A Man With Principles? (1943)

References

External links
 

1901 births
1948 deaths
German film actresses
Actresses from Stuttgart
20th-century German actresses